The Fortune of Christina McNab is a 1921 British silent comedy film directed by W. P. Kellino and starring Nora Swinburne, David Hawthorne and Francis Lister. It was made at Lime Grove Studios, based on a 1901 novel by Sarah Broom Macnaughtan. It was one in a series of get-rich-quick comedies made by Kellino, of which this is amongst the best known.

Cast
 Nora Swinburne as Christina McNab
 David Hawthorne as Colin McCrae
 Francis Lister as Duke of Southwark
 Sara Sample as Muriel Stonor
 Marjorie Chard as Lady Anne Drummond
 Chick Farr as Archie Anstruthers
 Norman Tharp as Mr. Drummond
 Gena Ray as Joan Drummond
 Eva Westlake as Lady Tarbutt
 Dora Levis as Jessie

References

Bibliography
 Low, Rachael. History of the British Film, 1918–1929. George Allen & Unwin, 1971.

External links
 

1921 films
1921 comedy films
British comedy films
British silent feature films
Films based on British novels
Films directed by W. P. Kellino
Films shot at Lime Grove Studios
British black-and-white films
1920s English-language films
1920s British films
Silent comedy films